Kamila Andini (born 6 May 1986) is an Indonesian film director known for her critically acclaimed debut, The Mirror Never Lies.

Biography
Andini was born on 6 May 1986 and is the eldest daughter of filmmaker Garin Nugroho. Although uninterested in cinematography for fear that she would be "work[ing] in her father's shadow", she began studying photography while still in junior high school, hoping to "capture people's life and behavior". While in senior high school her classmates often asked her father about film making, questions which Andini later said "ashamed" her because she knew nothing of her father's oeuvre. She later began to become involved with several film committees. Andini completed a degree in sociology at Deakin University in Melbourne, Australia.

Career
Upon her return to Indonesia, Andini began to work as a director. She handled music videos for groups such as Ungu and Slank, as well as documentaries on music and the ocean. One of these, Lagu untuk Tukik (A Song for Tukik), dealt with turtles in the ocean in the Wakatobi Regency – part of the Coral Triangle – and was screened as part of the Goethe Institute's Science Film Festival in 2012. In 2009 she assisted her father in directing Generasi Biru (The Blue Generation), about the band Slank.

Andini began production of her first feature film, The Mirror Never Lies, in 2009. The work took over two years of research and two months of filming to complete, owing to a lack of documentary evidence on the Bajau who are central to the film's narrative. Co-produced by Andini's father and former Miss Indonesia Nadine Chandrawinata and starring Atiqah Hasiholan, Reza Rahadian, and Gita Novalista, the film was based on a young Bajau girl who uses mirrors to try to find her lost father. It received numerous awards both domestically and internationally, including a Best Director nomination at the 2011 Indonesian Film Festival (IFF) before winning in the same category at the 2012's Bandung Film Festival.

In May 2012 she started working on her second feature film, to be about children and nature. This became The Seen and the Unseen (2017), a critically acclaimed work about young Balinese twins, one of whom is dying. It won the Adelaide Film Festival's Feature Fiction Award in 2019.

Her newest film, Yuni, premiered at the Platform program during the 2021 Toronto International Film Festival.

Personal life
In March 2012 Andini married fellow director Ifa Isfansyah. The two fell in love with each other after Isfansyah's 2011 film Sang Penari (The Dancer) had provided stiff competition to Andini's The Mirror Never Lies at the IFF.

Filmography

Awards and nominations

References

Works cited

External links
 

1986 births
Living people
Indonesian women film directors
Deakin University alumni
People from Jakarta